Mali competed in the 2003 All-Africa Games held at the National Stadium in the city of Abuja, Nigeria. The country’s team won six medals and came joint twenty-third in the medal table. The country competed in the first women’s football tournament in the history of the Games, and came fourth. Bourama Mariko won a silver medal in karate, and the team gained four bronze medals in taekwondo.

Competitors
Mali entered twenty nine events, twenty one for women and eight for men. After the previous two tournaments, where the country had only won a silver and two bronze medals respectively, the team was determined to bring back more medals. In the first women’s football tournament of the Games, the Malian team qualified in Group B, coming second to South Africa, but losing to Cameroon in the bronze medal play-off. Meanwhile, Moussa Konate competed in heavyweight boxing. In track and field, ten athletes competed in nine events, Oumar Diarra coming fourth in the 400 metres hurdles, Kadiatou Camara coming fifth in the long jump, Oumou Traore coming eighth in the discus and Kadiatou Camara reaching the semi-final of the 100 metres. The greatest hope, however, for the country lay in judo, and particularly Bourama Mariko, who went on to win the country’s only silver medal at the Games. At the same time, four competitors entered the karate tournament, Mamadou Ba Gueye, N’Fau Fofana, Samir Haidara and Tiekoura Sinayoko, laying foundations for the success in the sport at the following 2007 Games.

Medal summary
Mali won six medals, a silver and five bronze medals, and was ranked joint twenty third in the final medal table alongside Congo and Zambia.

Medal table

Silver Medal

Bronze Medal

References

2003 in Malian sport
2003
Nations at the 2003 All-Africa Games